Shichirō, Shichiro or Shichirou (written: 七郎) is a masculine Japanese given name. Notable people with the name include:

 (1914–1987), Japanese writer and guitarist
 (1854–1920), Imperial Japanese Navy admiral
 (1884–1951), Japanese mayor
 (1908–1995), Japanese linguist

Japanese masculine given names